College Football's National Championship is a 1994 American football video game that was released exclusively for the North American Sega Genesis video game system. A sequel, College Football's National Championship II, was released in 1995.

Summary
The game is based on the 1993 NCAA Division I-A football season.

Considered to be a clone of NFL Football '94 Starring Joe Montana with college teams, the game used exactly the same engine as the original program. Exhibition games and a tournament mode are available but not a regular season mode. Four players can play simultaneously with the help of the Team Player adaptor. Tournaments can be completely customized with either a customized schedule length and even a customized selection of opponents. Even the Wishbone and Option formations that were used in college football at that time were included.

Lon Simmons does the voice commentary in the game; he did the voice for all the Sports Talk Baseball series of video games for the Sega Genesis. There is a battery save that saves team records that are important for each college.

References

1994 video games
BlueSky Software games
College football video games
North America-exclusive video games
Sega video games
Sega Genesis games
Sega Genesis-only games
Multiplayer and single-player video games
Video games developed in the United States
Video games scored by Sam Powell